Princess Marie Luise Alexandra Karoline of Hohenzollern-Sigmaringen (17 November 1845 – 26 November 1912), later Countess of Flanders, was a princess of Hohenzollern-Sigmaringen, later simply of Hohenzollern. She married Prince Philippe, Count of Flanders, second son of King Leopold I of Belgium, and she was the mother of King Albert I.

Family
Marie was the youngest daughter and last of the six children of Prince Karl Anton, Prince of Hohenzollern, Prime minister of Prussia and Princess Josephine of Baden, and as such a younger sister of Prince Leopold, Prince of Hohenzollern, King Carol I of Romania and of Queen Stephanie, Queen Consort of Portugal

Marriage
Marie was considered as a potential wife for the future Edward VII of the United Kingdom. Though she was considered "quite lovely" by his family, her Roman Catholic religion barred her from being a suitable consort for the head of the Anglican church. On 25 April 1867 at St. Hedwig's Cathedral in Berlin, she married Prince Philippe, Count of Flanders, second son of King Leopold I of Belgium and Louise-Marie of Orléans.

They had five children:

Prince Baudouin of Belgium (3 June 1869 – 23 January 1891) he died of influenza at the age of 21.
Princess Henriette of Belgium (30 November 1870 – 28 March 1948) she is the twin Princess Joséphine Marie of Belgium. She married Prince Emmanuel, Duke of Vendôme on 12 February 1896. They had four children.
Princess Joséphine Marie of Belgium (30 November 1870 — 18 January 1871) she died at one month. 
Princess Joséphine Caroline of Belgium (18 October 1872 – 6 January 1958) she married Prince Karl Anton of Hohenzollern on 28 May 1894. They had four children.
King Albert I of the Belgians  (8 April 1875 – 17 February 1934) he married Duchess Elisabeth in Bavaria on 2 October 1900. They had three children. 

Princess Marie was an accomplished artist, even occasionally exhibiting her paintings at the Brussels Fair. She had a literary salon, which was the gathering place of many authors as well as a feature of Brussels social life for forty years. She also demonstrated appreciation for music, on one occasion awarding a gold medal to the Zoellner Quartet after it performed for the Belgian royalty.

Death
Marie Luise died in Belgium in 1912 at the age of 67, after suffering from pneumonia for several days. She was buried in the Church of Our Lady of Laeken.

Honours
  : Dame of the Order of Saint Elizabeth, 1900: Wedding Gift in honour of her Son.
  : 723rd Dame of the Order of Queen Maria Luisa - .
 Dame of the Starry Cross.
 Dame grand Cross in the Order of the Iron Crown.
 Dame of the Order of Saint Isabel.

Ancestry

References

Sources

1845 births
1912 deaths
Marie
People from Sigmaringen
Belgian princesses
Marie
Marie
Deaths from pneumonia in Belgium
Burials at the Church of Our Lady of Laeken
Daughters of monarchs

Dames of the Order of Saint Isabel
German salon-holders
Belgian salon-holders